Sami Yaffa (born Sami Lauri Takamäki; 4 September 1963) is a Finnish bass guitarist best known for his work in New York Dolls, Michael Monroe's bands, and Hanoi Rocks. He is currently the bassist for the Michael Monroe band and The Compulsions. He also plays guitar in his own band Mad Juana.

Biography 
Yaffa first began playing music in 1977, when he was fourteen years old, with a band called The Bablers. He went along with another member of the Bablers (Pepe Seivo) and formed a punk rock band, Suopo, in 1979. They did not record any material and stayed relatively unknown even in the Finnish punk rock scene. Around this time Yaffa also played with another Finnish punk rock band, Pohjanoteeraus.

Hanoi Rocks 

In 1980 Yaffa joined future Hanoi Rocks bandmate Andy McCoy in a legendary Finnish punk/rock band Pelle Miljoona Oy. The two of them took part in the band's most successful album "Moottoritie On Kuuma". Before the group toured they both decided to leave and to join Hanoi Rocks.

Hanoi Rocks became the biggest band in Finland at the time, releasing a string of successful albums. The group moved from Helsinki to London and continued to gain fans and influence the music scene there. Yaffa played bass in all the Hanoi Rocks albums released in 1980s. In London, Yaffa, along with Hanoi Rocks bandmates Nasty Suicide and Razzle, as well as Knox of the Vibrators, recorded an album under the name Fallen Angels. Knox continued to perform as Fallen Angels after, though the Hanoi Rocks members including Yaffa never played with the band on stage.

Playing with Johnny Thunders and Jetboy 
After Razzle's death in 1984, Yaffa left Hanoi Rocks and formed Chain Gang with Pelle Almgren in Stockholm. They recorded one EP under the name Pelle Almgren & Sam Yaffa. 1987 saw Yaffa doing a couple of gigs with then London based Johnny Thunders. Another member of the New York Dolls, Jerry Nolan, was also in the group.

Around this time he was asked to join San Francisco-based band Jetboy. He joined the band and stayed with them until 1990. He recorded two albums with Jet Boy: "Feel The Shake" and "Damned Nation". Although Jetboy toured all over the States, Yaffa still found time to play with Johnny Thunders' band on his US tour and with a group called Stronzo with Marc Ford of the Black Crowes and Craig Ross of Lenny Kravitz's band. While living and working in Los Angeles he got together again with Michael Monroe again and Yaffa even played a gig with Michael Monroe's solo band in Los Angeles in 1988.

In 1989 Yaffa briefly joined a Finnish band Smack who had moved to Los Angeles. He played bass on tracks "Can You Dig It" and "Crazy River". He was credited as Ulan Bator because he was still in Jetboy at the time and had been asked not to use his real name.

Jerusalem Slim 
Yaffa moved to New York City in 1990 to join Hanoi Rocks frontman Michael Monroe in a new band, Jerusalem Slim. The group also featured Billy Idol's guitarist, Steve Stevens. The band broke up in 1992, because of Michael Monroe's and Steve Stevens' strong musical disagreements. Jerusalem Slim released an album and did a tour as Jerusalem Slim although Steve Stevens was no longer in the band and the band refused to play any songs out of the actual Jerusalem Slim album.

From 1990 to 1993 Yaffa played in a band called Love Pirates with Gass Wylde of the Pretenders. Between 1991–1994 Yaffa also played in Alison Gordy's band. Gordy had earlier played with Johnny Thunders. Yaffa played on Gordy's album Blonde and Blue.

Demolition 23, Mad Juana, Joan Jett and Murphy's Law 
Demolition 23 saw Yaffa in another band with Michael Monroe. This group also featured Jay Henning (Star Star) and drummer Jimmy Clark. Henning was later replaced with Nasty Suicide. Demolition 23 recorded one album produced by Little Steven. The group broke up with only one album after Nasty left in the middle of a European tour. Earlier in 1993 Yaffa and Monroe recorded Steppenwolf's song "Magic Carpet Ride" with Guns N' Roses guitarist Slash for the movie Coneheads.

In 1995, Yaffa formed Mad Juana (briefly known as Lewt Vagrant) with his wife Karmen Guy. Yaffa described the band's sound as "Think of the Pogues meets (the) Clash with all acoustic instruments. Beautiful female voice in a Velvet Underground dungeon.". The following year he played bass on an album by Jan Stenfors, aka Hanoi Rocks' Nasty Suicide.

From 2000-02, Yaffa played in the New York based band Vasquez with former DGeneration guitarist Richard Bacchus.  Along with drummer Eric Kuby, this trio released one CD, titled "Two Songs", and also recorded a live record which remains unreleased to this day (Yaffa is in possession of the master tapes). In 2002 Yaffa toured in the United States and in Japan with Murphy's Law. He joined up with Joan Jett and played with her for a year, until 2004.

New York Dolls, Michael Monroe and The Compulsions with the members of Guns N' Roses 

In 2004, Yaffa joined the legendary punk/rock band New York Dolls. In 2006, when not working with the revamped New York Dolls, Yaffa also toured as a member of Jesse Malin's backing band. On 25 January 2010, ex-Hanoi Rocks singer Michael Monroe held a press conference is Los Angeles, introducing a new band named after the lead singer. Yaffa was introduced as the band's bass player.

The band's first live album was released in late September, and their first studio album Sensory Overdrive, produced by Jack Douglas was released in 2011. On 9 November 2011, Sensory Overdrive won the "Album of the Year" award at the 2011 Classic Rock magazine award. The first single, 78' from the album was chosen as the "Rock Song of the Year" by iTunes USA and Little Steven's Underground Garage Radio Shows listeners voted 'Trick of the Wrist' the "Coolest Song of the Year".

In 2011, Yaffa joined the American band The Compulsions. The band includes Richard Fortus and Frank Ferrer of Guns N' Roses on guitar and drums and Rob Carlyle who is the brains behind the group on guitar and vocals. Their new album Beat the Devil was released in 2011.

In 2012, Sami Yaffa was a co-host for Anthony Bourdain's No Reservations. In the sixth episode of season eight Yaffa travelled to Helsinki with Anthony Bourdain to show him all his favourite and all the strangest places in the capital of Finland, Helsinki. In 2014, Yaffa hosted a music-related travel television series Sound Tracker on Yle Teema, where he explored music and culture on various parts of the globe. The second season was aired in 2015. The series became available on Netflix in August 2016.

In 2021, Yaffa released a solo album titled, "The Innermost Journey To Your Outermost Mind".

References

External links 

Official website of Sami Yaffa's band Mad Juana
Sami Yaffa in Anthony Bourdain: No Reservations
Sami Yaffa – Sound Tracker

1963 births
Living people
Finnish bass guitarists
New York Dolls members
Hanoi Rocks members
Glam rock musicians
Finnish rock musicians